The Swiss Excellence Risen is a Swiss two-seat in side-by-side configuration, low wing ultralight aircraft, designed by Italian-Argentine aeronautical engineer Alberto Porto and produced by Swiss Excellence Airplanes. The aircraft was introduced at the 2015 AERO Friedrichshafen show. It is supplied ready-to-fly.

Design and development
The prototype was completed in 2012 and tested over the next three years before being publicly shown in 2015. The design entered production in mid-2015.

The aircraft has a glass cockpit, motorized canopy, autopilot, retractable landing gear and a ballistic parachute. The main structure is made from carbon fibre. Available engines are  Rotax 912 ULS and Rotax 912 iS and the  Rotax 914 turbocharged powerplant.

Operational history
In 2016 the design set an FAI Class R (Microlights and paramotors) world speed record for absolute speed of 323.82 km/h (201 mph) with a standard Rotax 912 engine. For this record the pilot Alberto Porto, who is also the CEO of Swiss Excellence Airplanes, received an Oscar from VFR Magazine and the De la Vaulx Medal by the FAI.

Variants
Swiss Excellence Risen
Model with retractable landing gear
Swiss Excellence Siren
Model with fixed landing gear and revised cockpit arrangement.

Specifications (Risen)

References

External links

2010s Swiss sport aircraft
2010s Swiss ultralight aircraft
Single-engined tractor aircraft
Low-wing aircraft
Aircraft first flown in 2012